Viscount Selby, of the City of Carlisle, is a title in the Peerage of the United Kingdom. It was created in 1905 for the Liberal politician Sir William Court Gully upon his retirement as Speaker of the House of Commons. He was the son of the physician James Manby Gully. The title of the viscountcy derived from the maiden name of Gully's wife, Elizabeth Selby, daughter of Thomas Selby.  the title is held by the first Viscount's great-great-great-grandson, the sixth Viscount, who succeeded his father in 2001.

The family seat is Ardfern House, near Lochgilphead, Argyll.

Viscounts Selby (1905)
William Court Gully, 1st Viscount Selby (1835–1909)
James William Herschell Gully, 2nd Viscount Selby (1867–1923)
Thomas Sutton Evelyn Gully, 3rd Viscount Selby (1911–1959)
Michael Guy John Gully, 4th Viscount Selby (1942–1997)
Edward Thomas William Gully, 5th Viscount Selby (1967–2001)
Christopher Rolf Thomas Gully, 6th Viscount Selby (b. 1993)

The heir presumptive is the present holder's great-uncle the Hon. James Edward Hugh Grey Gully (b. 1945).
The heir presumptive's heir apparent is his eldest son James Ian Mackenzie Gully (b. 1975)

References

Kidd, Charles, Williamson, David (editors). Debrett's Peerage and Baronetage (1990 edition). New York: St Martin's Press, 1990.

External links

Viscountcies in the Peerage of the United Kingdom
Noble titles created in 1905
Noble titles created for UK MPs
Peerages created for the Speaker of the House of Commons
1905 establishments in the United Kingdom